Al-Sharafiyah Madrasa is a madrasah complex in Aleppo, Syria.

See also
 Al-Firdaws Madrasa
 Al-Sultaniyah Madrasa
 Al-Uthmaniyah Madrasa
 Al-Zahiriyah Madrasa
 Ancient City of Aleppo
 Khusruwiyah Mosque

References

Religious buildings and structures completed in 1242
Madrasas in Aleppo